Stay the Night is a 2022 Canadian romantic drama film, written and directed by Renuka Jeyapalan. The film stars Andrea Bang and Joe Scarpellino. It was released to positive reviews from critics and was nominated for Best Sound Editing and Best Sound Mixing at the 2023 Canadian Screen Awards.

Premise
Grace is a woman who decides to seek out a one-night stand with a man after being passed over for a promotion at work for being too reserved; visiting a bar she meets Carter, a professional hockey player who is also at a career crossroads, with the two making a more profound emotional connection over the course of the evening than either expected.

Cast
Andrea Bang as Grace 
Joe Scarpellino as Carter
Humberly González as Joni
Raymond Ablack as Roshan
Graham Abbey as Coach Matthews
Raven Dauda as Claire

Release
The film premiered in March 2022 at South by Southwest. It was later released in theaters on October 7, 2022.

Critical reception 
The film received positive reviews from critics. On the review aggregation website Rotten Tomatoes, it holds an approval rating of 86% with an average rating of 7.6 out of 10, based on 14 reviews.

References

External links 
 
 

2022 films
2022 drama films
Canadian romantic drama films
English-language Canadian films
Films about Asian Canadians
2022 directorial debut films
2020s Canadian films
Films directed by Renuka Jeyapalan